Part of the Bible was first available in the Kurdish language in 1856. Modern translations of the whole Bible are available in standard Kurmanji and Sorani, with many portions in other dialects.

Kurmanji

Early translations
Part of the Bible was first available in the Kurdish language in 1856 in the Kurmanji dialect. The Gospels were translated by Stepan, an Armenian employee of the American Bible Society and were published in 1857. Isaac Grout Bliss, of the ABS, translated the rest of the New Testament, and the entire NT was published in Istanbul by A.H. Bohajian in 1872 in the Armenian Alphabet.

A new translation of the New Testament and Psalms, still in Armenian script was published in 1891.

Kamiran Alî Bedirxan
Proverbs in 1947, and Luke in 1953 were prepared by Kamuran Alî Bedirxan with assistance from a Dominican priest Thomas Bois. Luke was published in both Arabic and Latin scripts. These were published by the Bible Society in Lebanon. This edition of Proverbs was republished in Istanbul in 2014 by Avesta.

Komela Hêvî û Jiyanê
Komela Hêvî û Jiyanê released a translation of the whole Bible as "Kitêba Pîroz". This was translated into Kurmanji Kurdish by Resûlê Qereqoçanî and Seîdê Dewrêş. It was first published in Germany in 2004 by GBV-Dillenburg, and laterin Turkey by GDK (Gerçeğe Doğru Kitapları).

Bible Society in Turkey
The Bible Society in Turkey published the New Testament in modern Kurmanji in 2005. The Psalms were added in a subsequent printing (2015). Since then, translation of Old Testament books has been continuing and translations that have been consultant-checked are uploaded to Bible.com (Also referred to as the YouVersion app). As of March 2021, 21 of the 39 books of the  Old Testament are available for reading there. Audio readings of those books have been made available on SoundCloud to help oral learners, and to garner feedback on the translations for eventual printing of the whole Bible.

Institute for Bible Translation
Institute for Bible Translation is translating the Bible for Kurds in the post Soviet Union. The New Testament was completed in 2000 and a revised edition was released in 2011. There is ongoing work on the Old Testament. There work is published in both Cyrillic and Latin editions.

Kurdish Literature Association
Portions of the Bible have been translated into Behdini (Kurmanji of South Kurdistan): first John's Gospel, Luke/Acts and in 2019, the whole New Testament. This translation of the New Testament was completed by KLA (Kurdish Literature Association) and published by Biblica.

Comparison of translations

Sorani
P. von Oertzen translated the New Testament into Mokri dialect of Sorani Kurdish. The gospel of Mark was published in Bulgaria in 1909 in Arabic letters and the rest of this translation was never published.

In 1919, Ludvig Olsen Fossum of the United Norwegian Lutheran Church of America finished the whole New Testament and it was published in Arabic script under the title Injil Muqqades. 

Kurdish Sorani Standard Bible (KSS) is a recent translation of the complete Bible in Sorani Kurdish by Biblica (International Bible Society). It was released in Arabic script version in April 2017.

Comparison of translations

Zaza
The gospel of Luke has been translated into Zazaki Kurdish.

Southern Kurdish
The gospel of John was translated into Kermanshahi Kurdish in 1894. It was translated by Yahya Khan Kirmanshahi from Persian. Later this translation was revised and the rest of the gospels were translated by W. Claire Tisdall and Mirza Ismail. This was published in 1900 by the British and Foreign Bible Society.

See also
Kurdish Christians

External links
Kurdish Bible Online
1857 Version
1872 Version
1919 Version
Kitabi Piroz (Biblica's Kurdish Bible Online website)
A KIRMAŞANÎ TRANSLATION OF THE GOSPEL OF JOHN Article by Mustafa Dehqan

References

Kurdish
Kurdish language
Christianity in Kurdistan
Kurdish literature